The Scottish Junior Football Ayrshire Division One (also known as the Ayrshire District League) was the third-tier division of the West Region of the Scottish Junior Football Association. The two highest-placed teams at the end of the season were promoted to the Super League First Division.

It sat below two region-wide divisions and alongside a 'Central' geographical equivalent (with two divisions) representing the Ayrshire League and Central League which merged to form the West Region.

In 2018, the lower leagues in the region were reorganised, no longer being split geographically, with the result that the Central First and Second Divisions and the Ayrshire Division merged and were separated into two tiers (League One and League Two).

Member clubs for the 2016–17 season

Season summaries

External links
West Region Ayrshire Division at Non-League Scotland (archive version, 2007-08 membership)

3
Football in East Ayrshire
2002 establishments in Scotland
2018 disestablishments in Scotland
Sports leagues established in 2002
Sports leagues disestablished in 2018
Football in North Ayrshire
Football in South Ayrshire